Tacoma Station may refer to:

Tacoma Dome Station, a train station in Tacoma, Washington, used by Amtrak, commuter rail, and light rail
Tacoma station (1984), a former Amtrak station in Tacoma, Washington, opened in 1984
Union Station (Tacoma, Washington), a former train station that closed in 1984
Tacoma station (Milwaukee Road), a former Milwaukee Road train station

See also
Tacoma Link
Takoma (WMATA station)